Cricket in Iran is a fledgling sport growing in popularity, especially with youth and women. It is the most popular sport in Sistan and Baluchestan province. Iran has made significant progress in Under-16s and Women's cricket. The Under-16's promoted to and participated at the ACC U-16 Elite Cup in 2012 followed by a participation at the 2014 event. Women's national team promoted to and participated at the ACC Women's Premier Cup in 2014. 
Iran's playing season runs from September to April. There are 25 cricket clubs.

History
According to F S Ashley Cooper cricket in Iran has been known since 1856 when was first played in Bushire by the British who seized the town in the Anglo-Persian War. Ever since was played by the local Gymkhana, employees of the Indo-European Telegraph Company and teams of Men of War visiting the Persian Gulf.

During the first half of the twentieth century, in South Western Iran was played by the British Armed Forces and the employees of Anglo-Persian Oil Company. They set up cricket teams in Abadan, Masjed Soleyman, Aghajari and Haftkel. Later in the 1940s, due to efforts by Seyed Khalil Kazerooni (an Iranian CEO of the Anglo-Iranian Oil Company who as a school boy played Cricket for St Peter's School, York team in between 1930 and 1935) local Iranian cricket teams were formed by him in Abadan and himself played regularly.

In Tehran was played by employees of Imperial Bank of Persia, Indo-European Telegraph Company during the late nineteenth century and first half of the twentieth century, and post-World War Two by the personnel of the embassies of Great Britain, Australia, India and Pakistan and their citizens who resided in the Iranian capital.

The game was established in Sistan and Baluchestan province in 1981 by Pakistani nationals who lived in the province and became popular through contact between neighbouring Iranian and Pakistani cities, Chabahar and Gwadar, Saravan and Panjgur, Zahedan and Quetta.

In 2003 Hossein Ali Salimian, a former captain of Pakistani cricket teams such as South East Karachi Club and Sarhind Cricket Club and employee of Iran Ministry of Foreign Affairs, established a governing body for cricket which resulted in ACC and ICC affiliations in 2003 and formation of national team in 2004. After that the game slowly gained popularity. The federation of sports associations held a three-stage election campaign of the national team for the selection of the Iranian men’s cricket team. The first stage of this election campaign was held in Golestan province with 42 people, the second stage was held in Sistan Baluchestan province with 22 people, and the third stage will be held in the same province with 17 people. Mohammad Yousef Shadzehi is the only representative of the Saravan province in the Iranian men’s cricket team who will go on the Asian championship happening in Qatar after passing the last camp.
Mohammad Yousef Shadzehi is now known as Mr Cricket of Iran and wants to hold cricket training courses for adolescent age groups in 2019 in Iran, Ukraine, and Poland and part of the income from these training courses will be devoted to the charities related to orphans or unsupervised children. Mohammad Yousef Shadzehi or the so-called Mr Cricket of Iran has been playing cricket for 8 years and was fortunate enough to achieve championship in the city tournament in the form of Ramadan Cup for seven courses. In the provincial tournaments, Mr Cricket of Iran (Mohammad Yousef Shadzehi) has achieved second place twice, championship three times, second place in the international tournaments of peace and friendship, and second place in the national tournaments for two times.

Governing body

Islamic Republic of Iran Cricket Association is the official governing body of cricket in Iran. Its current headquarters is in Tehran.

Grounds
There are currently 15 cricket grounds in Iran.

Standard
 Peimankar Baharan Park Cricket Ground, Chabahar, Sistan and Baluchestan Province - (Under Construction)

Non-Standard
 Azadi Sport Complex, Tehran
 Shahid Beheshti Stadium, Mashhad
 Shahid Chamran Stadium, Taft
 Shohada Mohiabad Stadium, Gorgan
 Karkhaneh Baft Baluch Cricket Ground, Iranshahr
 Shahrdari Stadium, Iranshahr
 22 Bahman Stadium, Shiraz
 Bushehr
 Gonbad-e Kavus
 Kerman
 Kermanshah
 Konarak
 Saravan
 Zahedan

National team

The Iran national cricket team represents the country in international cricket matches.  The national team, formed in 2004, play in the Challenge division of the ACC Trophy. The team has also played in the ACC Middle East Cup in 2006.

Women's National team

The Iran women's national cricket team represents the country in Women's international cricket matches.  The women's national team, formed in 2009,  They play in ACC Women's Premier. The team has also played in the ACC Women’s Twenty20 Championship in 2009.

Domestic competitions

South West Persia Cup

National Championship

Men

 
 Notes:
 * W = Winner; R = Runner-up;  = 3rd; DNP = Did not play/participate; DSQ = Disqualified; WRW = Withdrew; TBD = To be decided

Women
 
 
 Notes:
 * W = Winner; R = Runner-up;  = 3rd; DNP = Did not play/participate; TBD = To be decided

National League

Men

 
   
   Notes:
   * W = Winner; R = Runner-up;  = 3rd; DNP = Did not play/participate; TBD = To be decided

Women

 
  
  Notes:
  * W = Winner; R = Runner-up;  = 3rd; DNP = Did not play/participate; TBD = To be decided

International competitions hosted in Iran

Friendly matches
In 2001, a combined team of Chabahar-Konarak hosted a team from Quetta in a friendly match which ended in victory for the Iranians.

Fajr Cup

Fajr Cup is a cricket tournament hosted by Iran annually in the month of February to celebrate the commemoration of the Iranian Revolution. The first tournament took place in 2007. Most years only local teams took part, however some years International teams participated.

The 2008 edition ran from February 24 to March 2, hosted by Chabahar. There were a total of four teams from Iran, Afghanistan, Pakistan and Oman.

The 2009 edition took place in Iranshahr from February 15 to February 23. The final standings of the eight participants were as follow 
1.Chabahar 254 Pts, 2. Afghanistan A 191 Pts, 3. Talar Ghasr Islamic Azad University Iranshahr, 4. Karachi XI, 
5. Regional Electricity Sistan va Baluchestan Zahedan, 6. Quetta-Panjgur XI, 7. Konarak XI and 8. Saravan XI.

For the event in 2014, Iran Cricket Association had sent invitations to Afghanistan, Pakistan and India to take part alongside Iran national cricket team and Iran U-19.

Tehran Tournament
In 2016, Tehran Tournament ran from April 27 to April 29, hosted at Azadi Sport Complex. There were a total of three teams from Iran and Hong Kong. Chabahar were the champions with 2 wins, Iran selection came second with 1 win and 1 loss, Hong Kong's Craigengower CC finished last with 2 losses.

Shahid Jangi Zehi Memorial Tournament
In 2016, this tournament was hosted at Kooh-e Mehregan Cricket Ground in Saravan from May 22 to May 25. Referees were Nazar Mohammad Firouzi, Amir Arbab, Rashed Bameri, Sarvar Sepahi and Abdolraouf Molazehi.

See also
Sport in Iran

References

External links
Iran Cricket Association site
Cricinfo-Iran
Iran pages on asiancricket.org

 
Sport in Iran